Mate Creek is a stream in the U.S. state of West Virginia. It is a tributary of Tug Fork.

Mate Creek was derives its name from "mate", a variant word for deer.

See also
List of rivers of West Virginia

References

Rivers of Mingo County, West Virginia